Hart Mountain in Manitoba is the highest peak in the Porcupine Hills of central Canada, with a max elevation of . It is located  NNW of the town of Swan River.

References 

Mountains of Manitoba
Mountains of Canada under 1000 metres